Katsuhiko Matsuda (born May 10, 1965) is a retired male decathlete from Japan.

International competitions

References

1965 births
Living people
Japanese decathletes
World Athletics Championships athletes for Japan
Japan Championships in Athletics winners